Tinagma perdicella is a moth in the  family Douglasiidae. It is found in the Netherlands, Belgium, France, Germany, Switzerland, Austria, Italy, Spain, Poland, Albania, Serbia, Croatia, the Czech Republic, Slovakia, North Macedonia, Romania, Norway, Sweden, Finland, the Baltic region, Belarus, Ukraine and Russia.

The wingspan is 8–12 mm. Adults have been recorded on wing from May to June.

The larvae feed on Fragaria vesca and possibly Potentilla and Rubus species. The larvae possibly mine the leaves of their host plant, although it is also reported that young larvae bore the petiole. Older larvae live freely in the heart of the plant.

References

External links
Lepiforum.de

Moths described in 1839
Douglasiidae